Bleiksvatnet is a lake in Andøy Municipality in Nordland county, Norway. The  lake is located just south of the village of Bleik on the island of Andøya. The Bleikmorenen nature reserve is located on the northern shore of the lake.

See also
 List of lakes in Norway

References

Andøy
Lakes of Nordland